The Seaplane Baby Clipper NC 16933 Crash took place in Rio de Janeiro on August 13, 1939. The aircraft, owned by Pan Am, was flying Miami-Rio, with stops in the cities of Antilla, Port-au-Prince, San Pedro de Macorís, San Juan, Port of Spain, Georgetown, Paramaribo, Cayenne, Belém, São Luís, Fortaleza, Natal, João Pessoa, Recife, Maceió, Aracaju, Salvador, Caravelas and Vitória. This would be the first accident of a Pan Am aircraft in Brazil.

Aircraft

The Sikorsky S-43 was a Flying Boat seaplane. Pan Am would order 10 units, which would be used on routes connecting the United States to the Caribbean and Latin America. The aircraft involved in the accident was manufactured at the Sikorsky Aircraft Industrial Plant in Bridgeport, CT. It was assigned the serial number "4324". Construction would be finished on December 20th, 1936. After being flight-tested and approved, it would receive tail number NC 16933 from the Civil Aeronautics Authority. These aircraft would be christened "Baby Clipper" by Pan Am. The "Baby Clippers" began service at Pan Am on September 10th, 1937 and would be retired in 1945.

Flight history

The aircraft involved was a three-year-old Sikorsky S-43B airliner registered NC16933.  It had first flown in 1936, and had accumulated a total of 3,650 flight hours during its career.

The aircraft took off from Miami on a scheduled international passenger flight to Rio de Janeiro, with many stopovers across the Caribbean and South America.  As it neared its destination, the aircraft circled Rio in preparation for a normal approach.  As it was circling, however, the left engine lost power, putting the aircraft into a descending left yaw turn.  As the yaw grew sharper, the pitch angle also steepened until the aircraft struck a caisson and crashed into Guanabara Bay, about one kilometer from Rio's Santos Dumont Airport.  Of the twelve passengers and four crew members, only two passengers survived.

References

External links
 Accident Report of the Air Safety Board of the Civil Aeronautics Authority, January 9, 1940 (PDF)

1939 in Brazil
Aviation accidents and incidents in 1939
Airliner accidents and incidents caused by engine failure
Aviation accidents and incidents in Brazil